Snitches Get Stitches is the second studio album by Indian singer and rapper Sidhu Moose Wala, self-released on 9 May 2020 without prior announcement. Moose Wala also served as executive producer, while the tracks were produced by Intense, Byg Byrd, Snappy, Nick Dhammu, Gur Sidhu , Amar Sandhu, and The Kidd.

Later in year 2021, song ‘Baapu’ was re-released in Yes I Am Student soundtrack.

Background 
Following the Moose Wala's disputes with his co-artists Brown Boyz over release of the song "My Block", Sidhu's various tracks were leaked on internet. Following the leak, Sidhu announced the album on his Instagram handle and released on the same day.

Track listing 
On YouTube, "Roti Chaldi" is included in the album as eighth track, whereas, on Music platforms "Cadillac" is included.

References 

Sidhu Moose Wala albums
2020 albums
Self-released albums